The  was Japan's first commercial nuclear power plant. 
The first unit was built in the early 1960s to the British Magnox design, and generated power from 1966 until it was decommissioned in 1998. 
A second unit, built at the site in the 1970s, was the first in Japan to produce over 1000 MW of electricity.
The site is located in Tokai in the Naka District in Ibaraki Prefecture, Japan and is operated by the Japan Atomic Power Company.  The total site area amounts to 0.76 km2 (188 acres) with 0.33 km2, or 43% of it, being green area that the company is working to preserve.

The plant has been not operational since the reactor shut down automatically due to the 2011 Tōhoku earthquake and tsunami.

Reactors on site

Unit 1

This reactor was built based on British developed Magnox technology for dual-use. 
Unit 1 will be the first nuclear reactor to be decommissioned in Japan. 
The experience in decommissioning this plant is expected to be of use in the future when more Japanese plants are decommissioned. 
Below is a brief time-line of the process.

 March 31, 1998: operations cease
 March 2001: last of the nuclear fuel moved off-site
 October 4, 2001: decommissioning plan announced
 December 2001: decommissioning begins, spent fuel pool is cleaned
 2003: turbine room and electric generator taken down
 Late 2004: fuel moving crane dismantled
 2011: the reactor itself is dismantled

Unit 2
Unit 2 is a Boiling Water Reactor and was the first nuclear reactor built in Japan to produce over 1,000 MW of electricity. 
By some formalities in the paperwork, the unit is technically separate from the rest of the nuclear facilities at Tokai-mura, but it is managed with the rest of them and even shares the same front gate.

History

In 2002, an evaluation technology adopted by the Japan Society of Civil Engineers had determined that the site of the plant could experience tsunami waves as high as 4.86 metres. 
The government of Ibaraki prefecture published their own calculations in October 2007, where they estimated that such waves could be as high as 6 to 7 metres. 
Japan Atomic Power changed its wave level assumption to 5.7 meters. Reconstruction works to raise the height of the 4.9-metre protection around the plant to 6.1 meters were started in July 2009, in order to protect the seawater pumps intended to cool an emergency diesel generator. Although most of the work was completed by September 2010, cable holes in the levee were still not fully covered. This work was scheduled to be completed around May 2011. 
Additions to the seawall were made to a 6.1 metre height two days before the 2011 Tōhoku earthquake and tsunami on 9 March 2011.

In November 2018, the NRA approved a 20-year extension. Following that, the operator will need the consent of the Ibaraki prefectural government, as well as six local municipalities, including the village of Tokai.

2011 earthquake and tsunami

When the tsunami did hit the Tokai plant in March 2011, the waves were 5.3 to 5.4 metres in height, higher than earlier estimations but still 30 to 40 centimetres lower than the most recent estimation. 
The Tokai plant suffered a loss of external power-supply. 
The levee was overrun, but only one of three seawater pumps failed, and the reactors could be kept stable and safe in cold shutdown with the emergency diesel generator cooled by the two remaining seawater pumps.

Following the 2011 Tōhoku earthquake and tsunami, the Number 2 reactor was one of eleven nuclear reactors nationwide to be shut down automatically. 
It was reported on 14 March that a cooling system pump for the Number 2 reactor had stopped working. 
Japan Atomic Power Company stated that there was a second operational pump and that cooling was working, but that two of three diesel generators used to power the cooling system were out of order.

Construction work on additional safety measures, including a 1.7 km sea wall to protect from possible tsunamis, was originally scheduled to be completed in March 2021.
In 2020 it was announced this was delayed until December 2022.

Stress tests

After the disaster in Fukushima, a stress-test was ordered by the Japanese government, since an investigation of the electrical installations of the Tokai Daini reactor revealed that they did not meet the earthquake-resistance standards set by the government.

Seismic research in 2011 did show, that the March 11th quake was caused by the simultaneous movement by multiple active faults at the coast of the Pacific Ocean in northern Japan, and on this way a much bigger earthquakes could be triggered, than the plants were planned to withstand, at the time they were built. In February the Tokai Daini Plant in Ibaraki Prefecture and the Tomari power facility in Hokkaido, said that it could not ruled out the possibility that the plant was vulnerable. Other nuclear power stations declared that the active faults near their nuclear plants would not move at the same time, and even when this would happen, the impact would be limited. NISA would look into the evaluation of active faults done by the plants.

In 2017 the Nuclear Regulation Authority discovered that the wrong fuel rod position data had been used in safety evaluations since the plant had been built, consequent to a change to fuel rod specifications during the design and construction process.

Public opinion
On 11 October 2011 Tatsuya Murakami, the mayor of the village Tokai, said in a meeting with minister Goshi Hosono, that the Tokai Daini reactor situated at 110 kilometer from Tokyo should be decommissioned, because the reactor was more than 30 years old, and the people had lost confidence in the nuclear safety commission of the government.

In 2011 and 2012, about 100,000 signatures against the resumption of the plant's operation, halted since last year, were submitted to Ibaraki Gov. Masaru Hashimoto. The petition urges the prefectural government not to allow the Tokai power station to resume operation, saying, "We should not allow a recurrence of the irretrievable sacrifice and loss as experienced in the Fukushima Daiichi nuclear power plant accident".

Mito District Court injunction

In March 2021, the Mito District Court ordered to stop Unit 2, following the request of 224 plaintiffs. The plaintiffs, residents of Ibaraki Prefecture and the Tokyo metropolitan area, filed a lawsuit in 2012 against the operator. One of the key contentions was the appropriateness of the Japan Atomic Power's seismic ground motion figure. The operator defended its basis seismic ground motion figure as 50 percent higher than the average. The plaintiffs contended that the figure should be four times as high as the current figure.

Reprocessing plant
There is also a reprocessing plant in Tokai, but part of it is slated for closure.

See also

 Fukushima Daiichi nuclear disaster
 List of boiling water reactors
 Lists of nuclear disasters and radioactive incidents
 List of nuclear power plants in Japan
 Tokaimura nuclear accident
 
 Rokkasho Reprocessing Plant, meant to be the successor of the Tokai reprocessing Plant

References

External links

1960s establishments in Japan
Buildings and structures in Ibaraki Prefecture
Nuclear power stations in Japan
Nuclear power stations using boiling water reactors
Tōkai, Ibaraki